This is a list of episodes for 16×9, a Canadian investigative journalism television program on the Global Television Network.

Season 1 (2008/09)
33 episodes have aired with a new episode every Sunday.

References 

16:9 The Bigger Picture